Petermann Peak,, also known as Petermann Fjeld, Petermanns Topp and Petermann Point is a mountain in King Christian X Land, Northeast Greenland. Administratively it is part of the Northeast Greenland National Park zone.

The area around Petermann Peak is uninhabited. This mountain is located in the high Arctic zone, where Polar climate prevails. The average annual temperature in the area is −16 °C. The warmest month is June, when the average temperature rises to −2 °C, and the coldest is January, with −22 °C.

Geography
It has a magnificent appearance, dominating the surrounding landscape. The Gregory Glacier flows from its northeastern side into the Knækdalen valley. The Kalifbjerg (2667 m), Kerberus (c. 2500 m), Gog (c. 2600 m) and Magog (c. 2400 m) peaks are located to the north of Petermann Peak. Initially believed to be the highest peak in Greenland, this mountain is one of the most renowned summits in northeastern Greenland together with Payer Peak located nearby.

The Petermann Peak is marked as a  peak in the Defense Mapping Agency Greenland Navigation charts and as a  mountain in other sources.

Historical background
Petermann Peak was first seen in August 1870 by Julius Payer and Ralph Copeland when they climbed Payer Peak. It was named Petermanns Spitze by Carl Koldewey during the Second German North Polar Expedition he led while first surveying and partially exploring Kaiser Franz Joseph Fjord in 1869–70. The peak was named after German geographer August Heinrich Petermann (1822–78) who was a great supporter of the expedition. In 1899 A.G. Nathorst mistook a lower peak in the vicinity, now named Nathorst Tinde, for Petermann Bjerg. At the turn of the century Petermann Peak was assumed to be the highest peak in all Greenland.

The first ascent of the peak was made on 15 August 1929 by the Cambridge Expedition to East Greenland led by Scottish polar explorer James Wordie (1890–1962). the second ascent by John Haller and Wolfgang Diehl on 9 August 1951.

See also
List of mountain peaks of Greenland
List of mountains in Greenland
List of the ultra-prominent summits of North America
List of the major 100-kilometer summits of North America

References

External links
AAJ - North America, Greenland, Petermann Peak
Peakery - Greenland mountains and peaks
Geological Magazine - A Contribution to the Geology of the Country between Petermann Peak and Kjerulf Fjord, East Greenland

Petermann
Petermann